MNP Tower is a 35-story high-rise office building in Downtown Vancouver, British Columbia. Standing at a height of 469 ft, it is the sixth tallest building in the city and the tallest office building. It was designed by the American architectural firm Kohn Pedersen Fox. Construction of the building began in 2012 and was completed in 2014.

See also
 List of tallest buildings in Vancouver
 MNP LLP

References

External links
Oxford Properties

Skyscrapers in Vancouver
Skyscraper office buildings in Canada
Kohn Pedersen Fox buildings
Office buildings completed in 2014
Modernist architecture in Canada